The Bell Boeing V-22 Osprey is an American multi-mission, tiltrotor military aircraft with both vertical takeoff and landing (VTOL) and short takeoff and landing (STOL) capabilities. It is designed to combine the functionality of a conventional helicopter with the long-range, high-speed cruise performance of a turboprop aircraft.

In 1980, the failure of Operation Eagle Claw (during the Iran hostage crisis) underscored that there were military roles for which neither conventional helicopters nor fixed-wing transport aircraft were well-suited. The United States Department of Defense (DoD) initiated a program to develop an innovative transport aircraft with long-range, high-speed, and vertical-takeoff capabilities, and the Joint-service Vertical take-off/landing Experimental (JVX) program officially commenced in 1981. A partnership between Bell Helicopter and Boeing Helicopters was awarded a development contract in 1983 for the V-22 tiltrotor aircraft. The Bell Boeing team jointly produces the aircraft. The V-22 first flew in 1989 and began flight testing and design alterations; the complexity and difficulties of being the first tiltrotor for military service led to many years of development.

The United States Marine Corps (USMC) began crew training for the MV-22B Osprey in 2000 and fielded it in 2007; it supplemented and then replaced their Boeing Vertol CH-46 Sea Knights. The U.S. Air Force (USAF) fielded its version of the tiltrotor, the CV-22B, in 2009. Since entering service with the Marine Corps and Air Force, the Osprey has been deployed in transportation and medevac operations over Iraq, Afghanistan, Libya, and Kuwait. The U.S. Navy planned to use the CMV-22B for carrier onboard delivery duties beginning in 2021.

Development

Origins
The failure of Operation Eagle Claw, the Iran hostage rescue mission, in 1980 demonstrated to the United States military a need for "a new type of aircraft, that could not only take off and land vertically but also could carry combat troops, and do so at speed." The U.S. Department of Defense began the JVX aircraft program in 1981, under U.S. Army leadership.

The defining mission of the USMC has been to perform an amphibious landing; the service quickly became interested in the JVX program. Recognizing that a concentrated force was vulnerable to a single nuclear weapon, airborne solutions with good speed and range allowed for rapid dispersal, and their CH-46 Sea Knights were wearing out. Without replacement, the USMC and the Army merging was a lingering threat, akin to President Truman's proposal following World War II. The Office of the Secretary of Defense and Navy administration opposed the tiltrotor project, but congressional pressure proved persuasive.

The Navy and USMC were given the lead in 1983. The JVX combined requirements from the USMC, USAF, Army and Navy. A request for proposals was issued in December 1982 for preliminary design work. Interest was expressed by Aérospatiale, Bell Helicopter, Boeing Vertol, Grumman, Lockheed, and Westland. Contractors were encouraged to form teams. Bell partnered with Boeing Vertol to submit a proposal for an enlarged version of the Bell XV-15 prototype on 17 February 1983. Being the only proposal received, a preliminary design contract was awarded on 26 April 1983.

The JVX aircraft was designated V-22 Osprey on 15 January 1985; by that March, the first six prototypes were being produced, and Boeing Vertol was expanded to handle the workload. Work was split evenly between Bell and Boeing. Bell Helicopter manufactures and integrates the wing, nacelles, rotors, drive system, tail surfaces, and aft ramp, as well as integrates the Rolls-Royce engines and performs final assembly. Boeing Helicopters manufactures and integrates the fuselage, cockpit, avionics, and flight controls. The USMC variant received the MV-22 designation, and the USAF variant received CV-22; this was reversed from normal procedure to prevent USMC Ospreys from having a conflicting CV designation with aircraft carriers. Full-scale development began in 1986. On 3 May 1986, Bell Boeing was awarded a US$1.714 billion contract for the V-22 by the U.S. Navy. At this point, all four U.S. military services had acquisition plans for the V-22.

The first V-22 was publicly rolled out in May 1988. That year, the U.S. Army left the program, citing a need to focus its budget on more immediate aviation programs. In 1989, the V-22 survived two separate Senate votes that could have resulted in cancellation. Despite the Senate's decision, the Department of Defense instructed the Navy not to spend more money on the V-22. As development cost projections greatly increased in 1988, Defense Secretary Dick Cheney tried to defund it from 1989 to 1992, but was overruled by Congress, which provided unrequested program funding. Multiple studies of alternatives found the V-22 provided more capability and effectiveness with similar operating costs. The Clinton Administration was supportive of the V-22, helping it attain funding.

Flight testing and design changes
The first of six prototypes first flew on 19 March 1989 in the helicopter mode and on 14 September 1989 in fixed-wing mode. The fourth and fifth prototypes crashed in 1991–92. From October 1992 to April 1993, the V-22 was redesigned to reduce empty weight, simplify manufacture, and reduce build costs; it was designated V-22B. Flights resumed in June 1993 after safety changes were made to the prototypes. Bell Boeing received a contract for the engineering manufacturing development (EMD) phase in June 1994. The prototypes were also modified to resemble the V-22B standard. At this stage, testing focused on flight envelope expansion, measuring flight loads, and supporting the EMD redesign. Flight testing with the early V-22s continued into 1997.

Flight testing of four full-scale development V-22s began at the Naval Air Warfare Test Center, Naval Air Station Patuxent River, Maryland. The first EMD flight took place on 5 February 1997. Testing soon fell behind schedule. The first of four low rate initial production aircraft, ordered on 28 April 1997, was delivered on 27 May 1999. The second sea trials were completed onboard  in January 1999. During external load testing in April 1999, a V-22 transported the lightweight M777 howitzer.

In 2000, there were two fatal crashes, killing a total of 23 marines, and the V-22 was again grounded while the crashes' causes were investigated and various parts were redesigned. In June 2005, the V-22 completed its final operational evaluation, including long-range deployments, high altitude, desert and shipboard operations; problems previously identified had reportedly been resolved.

By 2012, changes had been made to the hardware, software, and procedures in response to hydraulic fires in the nacelles, vortex ring state control issues, and opposed landings; reliability has improved accordingly.

An MV-22 landed and refueled onboard  in an evaluation in October 2012. In October 2015, NAVAIR tested rolling landings and takeoffs on a carrier, preparing for carrier onboard delivery.

Controversy

Development was protracted and controversial, partly because of large cost increases, some of which were caused by a requirement to fold wings and rotors to fit aboard ships. The development budget was first set at US$2.5 billion in 1986, increasing to a projected US$30 billion in 1988. By 2008, US$27 billion had been spent and another US$27.2 billion was required for planned production numbers. Between 2008 and 2011, the V-22's estimated lifetime cost grew by 61%, mostly for maintenance and support.

In 2001, Lieutenant Colonel Odin Lieberman, commander of the V-22 squadron at Marine Corps Air Station New River, was relieved of duty after allegations that he instructed his unit to falsify maintenance records to make it appear more reliable. Three officers were implicated for their roles in the falsification scandal.

In October 2007, a Time magazine article condemned the V-22 as unsafe, overpriced, and inadequate; the USMC responded that the article's data was partly obsolete, inaccurate, and held high expectations for any new field of aircraft. In 2011, the controversial defense industry supported Lexington Institute reported that the average mishap rate per flight hour over the past 10 years was the lowest of any USMC rotorcraft, approximately half of the average fleet accident rate. In 2011, Wired magazine reported that the safety record had excluded ground incidents; the USMC responded that MV-22 reporting used the same standards as other Navy aircraft.

By 2012, the USMC reported fleetwide readiness rate had risen to 68%; however, the DOD's Inspector General later found 167 of 200 reports had "improperly recorded" information. Captain Richard Ulsh blamed errors on incompetence, saying that they were "not malicious" or deliberate. The required mission capable rate was 82%, but the average was 53% from June 2007 to May 2010. In 2010, Naval Air Systems Command aimed for an 85% reliability rate by 2018. From 2009 to 2014, readiness rates rose 25% to the "high 80s", while cost per flight hour had dropped 20% to $9,520 through a rigorous maintenance improvement program that focused on diagnosing problems before failures occur. , although the V-22 requires more maintenance and has lower availability (62%) than traditional helicopters, it also has a lower mishap rate. V-22 ownership cost was $83,000 per hour in 2013.

While technically capable of autorotation if both engines fail in helicopter mode, a safe landing is difficult. In 2005, a director of the Pentagon's testing office stated that in a loss of power while hovering below , emergency landings "are not likely to be survivable." V-22 pilot Captain Justin "Moon" McKinney stated that: "We can turn it into a plane and glide it down, just like a C-130." A complete loss of power requires both engines to fail, as one engine can power both proprotors via interconnected drive shafts. Though vortex ring state (VRS) contributed to a deadly V-22 accident, flight testing found it to be less susceptible to VRS than conventional helicopters. A GAO report stated that the V-22 is "less forgiving than conventional helicopters" during VRS. Several test flights to explore VRS characteristics were canceled. The USMC trains pilots in the recognition of and recovery from VRS, and has instituted operational envelope limits and instrumentation to help avoid VRS conditions.

Production

On 28 September 2005, the Pentagon formally approved full-rate production, increasing from 11 V-22s per year to between 24 and 48 per year by 2012. Of the 458 total planned, 360 are for the USMC, 50 for the USAF, and 48 for the Navy at an average cost of $110 million per aircraft, including development costs. The V-22 had an incremental flyaway cost of $67 million per aircraft in 2008, The Navy had hoped to shave about $10 million off that cost via a five-year production contract in 2013. Each CV-22 cost $73 million in the FY 2014 budget.

On 15 April 2010, the Naval Air Systems Command awarded Bell Boeing a $42.1 million contract to design an integrated processor in response to avionics obsolescence and add new network capabilities. By 2014, Raytheon began providing an avionics upgrade that includes situational awareness and blue force tracking. In 2009, a contract for Block C upgrades was awarded to Bell Boeing. In February 2012, the USMC received the first V-22C, featuring a new radar, additional mission management and electronic warfare equipment. In 2015, options for upgrading all aircraft to the V-22C standard were examined.

On 12 June 2013, the U.S. DoD awarded a $4.9 billion contract for 99 V-22s in production Lots 17 and 18, including 92 MV-22s for the USMC, for completion in September 2019. A provision gives NAVAIR the option to order 23 more Ospreys. As of June 2013, the combined value of all contracts placed totaled $6.5 billion. In 2013, Bell laid off production staff following the US's order being cut to about half of the planned number. Production rate went from 40 in 2012 to 22 planned for 2015. Manufacturing robots have replaced older automated machines for increased accuracy and efficiency; large parts are held in place by suction cups and measured electronically.

In March 2014, Air Force Special Operations Command issued a Combat Mission Need Statement for armor to protect V-22 passengers. NAVAIR worked with a Florida-based composite armor company and the Army Aviation Development Directorate to develop and deliver the advanced ballistic stopping system (ABSS) by October 2014. Costing $270,000, the ABSS consists of 66 plates fitting along interior bulkheads and deck, adding  to the aircraft's weight, affecting payload and range. The ABSS can be installed or removed when needed in hours and partially assembled in pieces for partial protection of specific areas. As of May 2015, 16 kits had been delivered to the USAF.

In 2015, Bell Boeing set up the V-22 Readiness Operations Center at Ridley Park, Pennsylvania, to gather information from each aircraft to improve fleet performance in a similar manner as the F-35's Autonomic Logistics Information System.

Design

Overview

The Osprey is the world's first production tiltrotor aircraft, with one three-bladed proprotor, turboprop engine, and transmission nacelle mounted on each wingtip. It is classified as a powered lift aircraft by the Federal Aviation Administration. For takeoff and landing, it typically operates as a helicopter with the nacelles vertical and rotors horizontal. Once airborne, the nacelles rotate forward 90° in as little as 12 seconds for horizontal flight, converting the V-22 to a more fuel-efficient, higher speed turboprop aircraft. STOL rolling-takeoff and landing capability is achieved by having the nacelles tilted forward up to 45°. Other orientations are possible. Pilots describe the V-22 in airplane mode as comparable to the C-130 in feel and speed. It has a ferry range of over 2,100 nmi. Its operational range is 1,100 nmi.

Composite materials make up 43% of the airframe, and the proprotor blades also use composites. For storage, the V-22's rotors fold in 90 seconds and its wing rotates to align, front-to-back, with the fuselage. Because of the requirement for folding rotors, their 38-foot (11.6 m) diameter is 5 feet (1.5 m) less than would be optimal for an aircraft of this size to conduct vertical takeoff, resulting in high disk loading. Most missions use fixed wing flight 75% or more of the time, reducing wear and tear and operational costs. This fixed wing flight is higher than typical helicopter missions allowing longer range line-of-sight communications for improved command and control.

Exhaust heat from the V-22's engines can potentially damage ships' flight decks and coatings. NAVAIR devised a temporary fix of portable heat shields placed under the engines and determined that a long-term solution would require redesigning decks with heat resistant coating, passive thermal barriers, and ship structure changes. Similar changes are required for F-35B operations. In 2009, DARPA requested solutions for installing robust flight deck cooling.

Propulsion
The V-22's two Rolls-Royce AE 1107C engines are connected by drive shafts to a common central gearbox so that one engine can power both proprotors if an engine failure occurs. Either engine can power both proprotors through the wing driveshaft. However, the V-22 is generally not capable of hovering on one engine. If a proprotor gearbox fails, that proprotor cannot be feathered, and both engines must be stopped before an emergency landing. The autorotation characteristics are poor because of the rotors' low inertia.

In August 2014, the U.S. military issued a request for information for a potential drop-in replacement for the AE-1107C engines. In September 2014, the U.S. Navy, who already purchase engines separately to airframes, was reportedly considering an alternative engine supplier to reduce costs. The General Electric GE38 is one option, giving commonality with the Sikorsky CH-53K King Stallion.

The rotorwash usually prevents the starboard door's usage in hover; the rear ramp is used for rappelling and hoisting instead. The V-22 loses 10% of its vertical lift over a tiltwing design when operating in helicopter mode because of the wings' airflow resistance, while the tiltrotor design has better short takeoff and landing performance. V-22s must keep at least  of vertical separation between each other to avoid each other's rotor wake, which causes turbulence and potentially control loss.

Avionics

The V-22 is equipped with a glass cockpit, which incorporates four multi-function displays (MFDs, compatible with night-vision goggles) and one shared central display unit, to display various images including: digimaps, imagery from the Turreted forward-looking infrared system primary flight instruments, navigation (TACAN, VOR, ILS, GPS, INS), and system status. The flight director panel of the cockpit management system allows for fully coupled (autopilot) functions that take the aircraft from forward flight into a  hover with no pilot interaction other than programming the system. The fuselage is not pressurized, and personnel must wear on-board oxygen masks above 10,000 feet.

The V-22 has triple-redundant fly-by-wire flight control systems; these have computerized damage control to automatically isolate damaged areas. With the nacelles pointing straight up in conversion mode at 90° the flight computers command it to fly like a helicopter, cyclic forces being applied to a conventional swashplate at the rotor hub. With the nacelles in airplane mode (0°) the flaperons, rudder, and elevator fly similar to an airplane. This is a gradual transition, occurring over the nacelles' rotation range; the lower the nacelles, the greater effect of the airplane-mode control surfaces. The nacelles can rotate past vertical to 97.5° for rearward flight. The V-22 can use the "80 Jump" orientation with the nacelles at 80° for takeoff to quickly achieve high altitude and speed. The controls automate to the extent that it can hover in low wind without hands on the controls.

New USMC V-22 pilots learn to fly helicopter and multiengine fixed-wing aircraft before the tiltrotor. Some V-22 pilots believe that former fixed-wing pilots may be preferable over helicopter users, as they are not trained to constantly adjust the controls in hover. Others say that experience with helicopters' hovering and precision is most important.  the US military does not track whether fixed-wing or helicopter pilots transition more easily to the V-22, according to USMC Colonel Matthew Kelly, V-22 project manager. He said that fixed-wing pilots are more experienced at instrument flying, while helicopter pilots are more experienced at scanning outside when the aircraft is moving slowly.

Armament
The V-22 can be armed with one 7.62×51mm NATO (.308 in caliber) M240 machine gun or .50 in caliber (12.7 mm) M2 machine gun on the rear loading ramp. A 12.7 mm (.50 in) GAU-19 three-barrel Gatling gun mounted below the nose was studied. BAE Systems developed a belly-mounted, remotely operated gun turret system, the Interim Defense Weapon System (IDWS); it is remotely operated by a gunner, targets are acquired via a separate pod using color television and forward looking infrared imagery. The IDWS was installed on half of the V-22s deployed to Afghanistan in 2009; it found limited use because of its  weight and restrictive rules of engagement.

There were 32 IDWSs available to the USMC in June 2012; V-22s often flew without it as the added weight reduced cargo capacity. The V-22's speed allows it to outrun conventional support helicopters, thus a self-defense capability was required on long-range independent operations. The infrared gun camera proved useful for reconnaissance and surveillance. Other weapons were studied to provide all-quadrant fire, including nose guns, door guns, and non-lethal countermeasures to work with the current ramp-mounted machine gun and the IDWS.

In 2014, the USMC studied new weapons with "all-axis, stand-off, and precision capabilities", akin to the AGM-114 Hellfire, AGM-176 Griffin, Joint Air-to-Ground Missile, and GBU-53/B SDB II. In November 2014, Bell Boeing conducted self-funded weapons tests, equipping a V-22 with a pylon on the front fuselage and replacing the AN/AAQ-27A EO camera with an L-3 Wescam MX-15 sensor/laser designator. 26 unguided Hydra 70 rockets, two guided APKWS rockets, and two Griffin B missiles were fired over five flights. The USMC and USAF sought a traversable nose-mounted weapon connected to a helmet-mounted sight; recoil complicated integrating a forward-facing gun. A pylon could carry  of munitions. However, by 2019, the USMC opted for IDWS upgrades over adopting new weapons.

Refueling capability
Boeing is developing a roll-on/roll-off aerial refueling kit, which would give the V-22 the ability to refuel other aircraft. Having an aerial refueling capability that can be based on Wasp-class amphibious assault ships would increase the F-35B's strike power, removing reliance on refueling assets solely based on large s or land bases. The roll-on/roll-off kit can also be applicable to intelligence, surveillance and reconnaissance (ISR) functions. Boeing funded a non-functional demonstration on a VMX-22 aircraft; a prototype kit was successfully tested with an F/A-18 on 5 September 2013.

The ramp must open to extend the hose, then raised once extended. It can refuel rotorcraft, needing a separate drogue used specifically by helicopters and a converted nacelle. Many USMC ground vehicles can run on aviation fuel; a refueling V-22 could service these. In late 2014, it was stated that V-22 tankers could be in use by 2017, but contract delays pushed IOC to late 2019. As part of a 26 May 2016 contract award to Boeing, Cobham was contracted to adapt their FR-300 hose drum unit as used by the KC-130 in October 2016. While the Navy has not declared its interest in the capability, it could be leveraged later on.

Operational history
In October 2019, the fleet of 375 V-22s operated by the U.S. Armed Forces surpassed the 500,000 flight hour mark.

U.S. Marine Corps

Since March 2000, VMMT-204 has conducted training for the type. In December 2005, Lieutenant General James Amos, commander of II Marine Expeditionary Force, accepted delivery of the first batch of MV-22s. The unit reactivated in March 2006 as the first MV-22 squadron, redesignated as VMM-263. In 2007, HMM-266 became Marine Medium Tiltrotor Squadron 266 (VMM-266) and reached initial operational capability. It started replacing the CH-46 Sea Knight in 2007; the CH-46 was retired in October 2014. On 13 April 2007, the USMC announced the first V-22 combat deployment at Al Asad Airbase, Iraq.

V-22s in Iraq's Anbar province were used for transport and scout missions. General David Petraeus, the top U.S. military commander in Iraq, used one to visit troops on Christmas Day 2007; as did Barack Obama during his 2008 presidential campaign tour in Iraq. USMC Col. Kelly recalled how visitors were reluctant to fly on the unfamiliar aircraft, but after seeing its speed and ability to fly above ground fire, "All of a sudden, the entire flight schedule was booked. No senior officer wanted to go anywhere unless they could fly on the V-22". Obtaining spares proved problematic. By July 2008, the V-22 had flown 3,000 sorties totaling 5,200 hours in Iraq. General George J. Trautman III praised its greater speed and range over legacy helicopters, saying "it turned his battle space from the size of Texas into the size of Rhode Island." Despite attacks by man-portable air-defense systems and small arms, none were lost to enemy fire by late 2009.

A Government Accountability Office study stated that by January 2009, the 12 MV-22s in Iraq had completed all assigned missions; mission capable rates averaged 57% to 68%, and an overall full mission capable rate of 6%. It also noted weaknesses in situational awareness, maintenance, shipboard operations and transport capability. The report concluded: "deployments confirmed that the V-22's enhanced speed and range enable personnel and internal cargo to be transported faster and farther than is possible with the legacy helicopters".

MV-22s deployed to Afghanistan in November 2009 with VMM-261; it saw its first offensive combat mission, Operation Cobra's Anger, on 4 December 2009. V-22s assisted in inserting 1,000 USMC and 150 Afghan troops into the Now Zad Valley of Helmand Province in southern Afghanistan to disrupt Taliban operations. General James Amos stated that Afghanistan's MV-22s had surpassed 100,000 flight hours, calling it "the safest airplane, or close to the safest airplane" in the USMC inventory. The V-22's Afghan deployment was set to end in late 2013 with the drawdown of combat operations; however, VMM-261 was directed to extend operations for casualty evacuation, being quicker than helicopters enabled more casualties to reach a hospital within the 'golden hour'; they were fitted with medical equipment such as heart monitors and triage supplies.

In January 2010, the MV-22 was sent to Haiti as part of Operation Unified Response relief efforts after an earthquake, the type's first humanitarian mission. In March 2011, two MV-22s from  helped rescue a downed USAF F-15E crew member during Operation Odyssey Dawn. On 2 May 2011, following Operation Neptune's Spear, the body of Osama bin Laden, founder of the al-Qaeda terrorist group, was flown by an MV-22 to the aircraft carrier  in the Arabian Sea, prior to his burial at sea.

In 2013, several MV-22s received communications and seating modifications to support the Marine One presidential transport squadron because of the urgent need for CH-53Es in Afghanistan. In May 2010, Boeing announced plans to submit the V-22 for the VXX presidential transport replacement.

From 2 to 5 August 2013, two MV-22s completed the longest distance Osprey tanking mission to date.

In 2013, the USMC formed an intercontinental response force, the Special Purpose Marine Air-Ground Task Force – Crisis Response – Africa, using V-22s outfitted with specialized communications gear. In 2013, following Typhoon Haiyan, 12 MV-22s of the 3rd Marine Expeditionary Brigade were deployed to the Philippines for disaster relief operations; its abilities were described as "uniquely relevant", flying faster and with greater payloads while moving supplies throughout the island archipelago.

U.S. Air Force

The USAF's first operational CV-22 was delivered to the 58th Special Operations Wing (58th SOW) at Kirtland Air Force Base, New Mexico, in March 2006. Early aircraft were delivered to the 58th SOW and used for training personnel for special operations use. On 16 November 2006, the USAF officially accepted the CV-22 in a ceremony conducted at Hurlburt Field, Florida. The USAF's first operational deployment sent four CV-22s to Mali in November 2008 in support of Exercise Flintlock. The CV-22s flew nonstop from Hurlburt Field, Florida, with in-flight refueling. AFSOC declared that the 8th Special Operations Squadron reached Initial Operational Capability in March 2009, with six CV-22s in service.

In December 2013, three CV-22s came under small arms fire while trying to evacuate American civilians in Bor, South Sudan, during the 2013 South Sudanese political crisis; the aircraft flew  to Entebbe, Uganda, after the mission was aborted. South Sudanese officials stated that the attackers were rebels. The CV-22s had flown to Bor over three countries across . The formation was hit 119 times, wounding four crew and causing flight control failures and hydraulic and fuel leaks on all three aircraft. Fuel leaks resulted in multiple air-to-air refuelings en route. After the incident, AFSOC developed optional armor floor panels.

The USAF found that "CV-22 wake modeling is inadequate for a trailing aircraft to make accurate estimations of safe separation from the preceding aircraft." In 2015, the USAF sought to configure the CV-22 to perform combat search and rescue in addition to its long-range special operations transport mission. It would complement the HH-60G Pave Hawk and planned HH-60W rescue helicopters, being employed in scenarios where high speed is better suited to search and rescue than more nimble but slower helicopters.

U.S. Navy

The V-22 program originally included Navy 48 HV-22s, but none were ordered. In 2009, it was proposed that it replace the C-2 Greyhound for carrier onboard delivery (COD) duties. One advantage of the V-22 is the ability to deliver supplies and people between non-carrier ships beyond helicopter range. Proponents said that it is capable of similar speed, payload capacity, and lift performance to the C-2, and can carry greater payloads over short ranges, up to 20,000 lb, including suspended external loads. The C-2 can only deliver cargo to carriers, requiring further distribution to smaller vessels via helicopters, while the V-22 is certified for operating upon amphibious ships, aircraft carriers, and logistics ships. It could also take some helicopter roles by fitting a 600 lb hoist to the ramp and a cabin configuration for 12 non-ambulatory patients and 5 seats for medical attendants. Bell and P&W designed a frame for the V-22 to transport the Pratt & Whitney F135 engine of the Lockheed Martin F-35.

On 5 January 2015, the Navy and USMC signed a memorandum of understanding to buy the V-22 for the COD mission. Initially designated HV-22, four aircraft were bought each year from 2018 to 2020. It incorporates an extended-range fuel system for an  unrefueled range, a high-frequency radio for over-the-horizon communications, and a public address system to communicate with passengers; the range increase comes from extra fuel bladders through larger external sponsons, the only external difference from other variants. Its primary mission is long-range logistics; other conceivable missions include personnel recovery and special warfare. In February 2016, the Navy officially designated it the CMV-22B. The Navy's Program of Record originally called for 48 aircraft, it later determined that only 44 were required. Production began in FY 2018, and deliveries start in 2020.

The Navy ordered the first 39 CMV-22Bs in June 2018; initial operating capability is anticipated to be achieved in 2021, with fielding to the fleet by the mid-2020s. The first CMV-22B made its initial flight in December 2019. The first deployment began in summer 2021 aboard the USS Carl Vinson.

Japan Self-Defense Forces
In 2012, former Defense Minister Satoshi Morimoto ordered an investigation of the costs of V-22 operations. The V-22's capabilities exceeded current Japan Self-Defense Forces helicopters in terms of range, speed and payload. The ministry anticipated deployments to the Nansei Islands and the Senkaku Islands, as well as in multinational cooperation with the U.S. In November 2014, the Japanese Ministry of Defense decided to procure 17 V-22s. The first V-22 for Japan undertook its first flight in August 2017 and the aircraft began delivery to the Japanese military in 2020.

In September 2018, the Japanese Ministry of Defense decided to delay the deployment of the first five MV-22Bs it had received amid opposition and ongoing negotiations in the Saga Prefecture, where the aircraft are to be based. On 8 May 2020, the first two of the five aircraft were delivered to the JGSDF at Kisarazu Air Field after failing to reach an agreement with Saga prefecture residents. It is planned to eventually station some V-22s on board the s.

Potential operators

India
In 2015, the Indian Aviation Research Centre showed interest in acquiring four V-22s for personnel evacuation in hostile conditions, logistic supplies, and deployment of the Special Frontier Force in border areas. US V-22s performed relief operations after the April 2015 Nepal earthquake. The Indian Navy also studied the V-22 rather than the E-2D for airborne early warning and control to replace the short-range Kamov Ka-31. India is interested in purchasing six attack version V-22s for rapid troop insertion in border areas.

Indonesia
On 6 July 2020, the U.S. State Department announced that they had approved a possible Foreign Military Sale to Indonesia of eight Block C MV-22s and related equipment for an estimated cost of $2 billion.  The U.S. Defense Security Cooperation Agency notified Congress of this possible sale.

Israel
On 22 April 2013, an agreement was signed to sell six V-22 to the Israeli Air Force. By the end of 2016, Israel had not ordered the V-22 and was instead interested in buying the C-47 Chinook helicopter or the CH-53K helicopter. As of 2017, Israel had frozen its evaluation of the V-22, "with a senior defence source indicating that the tiltrotor is unable to perform some missions currently conducted using its Sikorsky CH-53 transport helicopters."

Variants

V-22A Pre-production full-scale development aircraft used for flight testing. These are unofficially considered A-variants after the 1993 redesign.

CV-22B U.S. Air Force variant for the U.S. Special Operations Command. It conducts long-range special operations missions and is equipped with extra wing fuel tanks, an AN/APQ-186 terrain-following radar, and other equipment such as the AN/ALQ-211, and AN/AAQ-24 Nemesis Directional Infrared Counter Measures. The fuel capacity is increased by 588 gallons (2,230 L) with two inboard wing tanks; three auxiliary tanks (200 or 430 gal) can also be added in the cabin. The CV-22 replaced the MH-53 Pave Low.

MV-22B U.S. Marine Corps variant. The Marine Corps is the lead service in the V-22's development. The Marine Corps variant is an assault transport for troops, equipment and supplies, capable of operating from ships or expeditionary airfields ashore. It replaced the Marine Corps' CH-46E and CH-53D fleets.

CMV-22B U.S. Navy variant for the carrier onboard delivery role. Similar to the MV-22B but includes an extended-range fuel system, a high-frequency radio, and a public address system.

EV-22 Proposed airborne early warning and control variant. The Royal Navy studied this variant as a replacement for its current fleet of carrier-based Sea King ASaC.7 helicopters.

HV-22 The U.S. Navy considered an HV-22 to provide combat search and rescue, delivery and retrieval of special warfare teams along with fleet logistic support transport. It chose the MH-60S for this role in 2001.

SV-22 Proposed anti-submarine warfare variant. The U.S. Navy studied the SV-22 in the 1980s to replace S-3 and SH-2 aircraft.

Operators

Japan Self-Defense Forces (2 delivered, 3 on order, plans for 12 more)

United States Air Force
7th Special Operations Squadron
8th Special Operations Squadron
20th Special Operations Squadron
21st Special Operations Squadron 
71st Special Operations Squadron
418th Flight Test Squadron

United States Marine Corps
HMX-1
VMX-22
VMM-161
VMM-162
VMM-163
VMM-165
VMM-166
VMMT-204
VMM-261
VMM-263
VMM-264
VMM-266
VMM-362
VMM-363
VMM-365
VMM-561
United States Navy – 44 CMV-22Bs on order, with deliveries to start in 2020.
 HX-21
VRM-30

Accidents
 

The V-22 Osprey has had 13 hull-loss accidents with a total of 51 fatalities. During testing from 1991 to 2000, there were four crashes resulting in 30 fatalities. Since becoming operational in 2007, the V-22 has had eight crashes resulting in 16 fatalities and several minor incidents. The aircraft's accident history has generated some controversy over its perceived safety issues.

Aircraft on display

 163911 – V-22A on display at the Aviation Memorial at Marine Corps Air Station New River in Jacksonville, North Carolina.
 163913 – V-22A on display at the American Helicopter Museum & Education Center in West Chester, Pennsylvania.
 99-0021 (formerly 164939) – CV-22B on display at the National Museum of the United States Air Force at Wright-Patterson AFB in Dayton, Ohio.
 164940 – MV-22B on display at the Patuxent River Naval Air Museum in Lexington Park, Maryland.

Specifications (MV-22B)

Notable appearances in media

See also

References

Bibliography

Markman, Steve and Bill Holder. "Bell/Boeing V-22 Osprey Tilt-Engine VTOL Transport (U.S.A.)". Straight Up: A History of Vertical Flight. Atglen, Pennsylvania: Schiffer Publishing, 2000. .
Norton, Bill. Bell Boeing V-22 Osprey, Tiltrotor Tactical Transport. Earl Shilton, Leicester, UK: Midland Publishing, 2004. .
O'Hanlon, Michael E. Defense Policy Choices for the Bush Administration. Washington, D.C.: Brookings Institution Press, 2002. .
Schinasi, Katherine V. Defense Acquisitions: Readiness of the Marine Corps' V-22 Aircraft for Full-Rate Production. Darby, Pennsylvania: Diane Publishing, 2008. .
Whittle, Richard. The Dream Machine: The Untold History of the Notorious V-22 Osprey. New York: Simon & Schuster, 2010. .

External links

Official Bell V-22 page
Official Boeing V-22 page

Tiltrotor aircraft
V-22
V-22
Boeing V-22
High-wing aircraft
Turboshaft-powered aircraft
Articles containing video clips
Aircraft first flown in 1989